PCEA is an initialism for:
 Patient-controlled epidural analgesia
 the Presbyterian Church of Eastern Australia
 the Presbyterian Church of East Africa
 the Professional Construction Estimators Association of America, Inc.
 Police and Criminal Evidence Act 1984